Choir Boys can refer to:
the plural of Choir boy, i.e. singers in a boys - or mixed choir (especially church - and/or school choirs)
 Boy soprano
 Choir Boys (SpongeBob SquarePants), an episode of SpongeBob SquarePants
 The Choirboys (boyband)
 The Choirboys, an Australian Hard rock band.